Alex Formenton (born September 13, 1999) is a Canadian professional ice hockey left winger currently playing for HC Ambrì-Piotta of the National League (NL) with his NHL rights being held by the Ottawa Senators of the National Hockey League (NHL). He was selected in the second round, 47th overall, by the Senators in the 2017 NHL Entry Draft.

Playing career
Formenton was drafted by the major junior London Knights in the 2015 Ontario Hockey League Priority Draft in the eleventh round, 216th overall. In 2016, Formenton formally joined the Knights and recorded 16 goals and 34 points in 65 games. On the basis of that season, the Ottawa Senators selected him in the second round of the 2017 NHL Entry Draft, 47th overall.

Formenton was invited to the Ottawa Senators main training camp after attending its development camp in the summer of 2017. At the end of training camp, Ottawa retained him on its NHL roster to open the 2017–18 season and signed him to a three-year entry-level contract. Formenton made his NHL debut on October 7, 2017, becoming the youngest player to play a game for the contemporary Ottawa Senators. He was a healthy scratch after that game, and on October 15, he was returned by the Senators to continue his development with the London Knights. After the 2017–18 OHL season, Formenton was reassigned to the Belleville Senators, the Senators American Hockey League (AHL) affiliate.

Formenton earned a spot on the Senators' 2018–19 roster. On October 30, Formenton scored his first career NHL goal against Arizona Coyotes' goaltender Antti Raanta in a 5–1 loss. After nine games with the club, Formenton was assigned to the Knights.

After making the Senators out of training camp for two straight seasons, but failing to stick with the team, for the 2019–20 season, Formenton was assigned to Belleville to help round out his game. Before the season was cancelled due to the COVID-19 pandemic, Formenton scored 27 goals and 53 points in 61 games with Belleville. He was named to the AHL's All-Rookie Team alongside teammate Josh Norris.

Formenton played with Ottawa for the 2021–22 season, establishing himself as a solid penalty killer. In November, Formenton contracted COVID-19 and was placed in the NHL's COVID-19 protocol. He finished the season with 18 goals and 32 points in 79 games.

After his contract expired after the 2021–22 season, the Senators and Formenton could not agree to terms on a new contract. Remaining un-signed and later becoming ineligible to appear in the 2022–23 NHL season, Formenton belatedly signed abroad in signing for the remainder of the season with Swiss club, HC Ambrì-Piotta of the National League (NL), on December 14, 2022.

International play
Formenton, along with teammate Robert Thomas, was selected to represent Canada at the 2018 World Junior Ice Hockey Championships, where he helped them win a gold medal.

Career statistics

Regular season and playoffs

International

Awards and honors

References

External links
 
 

1999 births
HC Ambrì-Piotta players
Belleville Senators players
Canadian ice hockey left wingers
Ice hockey people from Ontario
Living people
London Knights players
Ottawa Senators draft picks
Ottawa Senators players
Sportspeople from King, Ontario